Nipponidion okinawense is a species of comb-footed spider in the family Theridiidae. It is found in Okinawa (Japan).

Males measure  and females  in body length.

References

Theridiidae
Spiders of Asia
Arthropods of Japan
Endemic fauna of the Ryukyu Islands
Spiders described in 2001